Sphinx kalmiae, the laurel sphinx, is a moth of the  family Sphingidae.

Distribution 
It is found in the temperate parts of the United States and southern Canada east of the Great Plains, in the north it occurs west of the Rocky Mountains.

Description 
The wingspan is 75–103 mm.

Biology 
In Canada, there is one generation per year with adults on wing in June and July. More to the south, there are two generations per year with adults on wing from late May to June and again from July to August. There may be as many as six generations in Louisiana.

The larvae feed on Chionanthus, Kalmia, Syringa and Fraxinus species. They are blue-green or yellow-green with seven diagonal lines that are white edged with black above and usually yellow below.

Taxonomy 
English entomologist James Edward Smith named this moth after Kalmia, the plant on which its caterpillar was first observed.

References

External links
Moths of North Dakota
Sphinx kalmiae, the Laurel Sphinx

Moths of North America
Sphinx (genus)
Moths described in 1797